Khaled Ben Yahia (born 12 November 1959) is a Tunisian retired footballer and a current manager. He competed in the men's tournament at the 1988 Summer Olympics.

References

External links
 

1959 births
Living people
Tunisian footballers
Espérance Sportive de Tunis players
Tunisia international footballers
Olympic footballers of Tunisia
Footballers at the 1988 Summer Olympics
Place of birth missing (living people)
Association football defenders
Tunisian football managers
Espérance Sportive de Tunis managers
Al-Ta'ee managers
EGS Gafsa managers
CS Sfaxien managers
Stade Gabèsien managers
US Tataouine managers
Olympique Béja managers
Saudi Professional League managers
Tunisian expatriate football managers
Tunisian expatriate sportspeople in Saudi Arabia